UIB may refer to:

Universities
 International University of Batam (Indonesian: Universitas Internasional Batam), Riau Province, Indonesia
 University of the Balearic Islands, Spain
 University of Bergen, Norway

Banks
 Union Internationale de Banques, a commercial bank in Tunisia
 United Industrial Bank, now part of Allahabad Bank, Calcutta, India

Other uses
 El Caraño Airport in Quibdó, Colombia (IATA airport code UIB)
 UIB metro station, on the campus of the University of the Balearic Islands
 Updated Irish Braille, 2014 version of Irish Braille